Reluctant Imposter is a 1925 German silent film directed by Géza von Bolváry.

It was made at the Bavaria Studios in Munich.

Cast
Vladimir Gajdarov
Olga Gzovskaya
Ellen Kürti
Ferdinand Martini
Toni Tetzlaff

References

External links

Films of the Weimar Republic
Films directed by Géza von Bolváry
German silent feature films
Bavaria Film films
Films shot at Bavaria Studios
German black-and-white films